Barrina is a genus of fungi within the class Sordariomycetes. This genus was named after mycologist Margaret E. Barr. A monotypic genus, Barrina contains the single species Barrina polyspora, described as new to science in 1997.

References

Monotypic Sordariomycetes genera
Coniochaetales